Frank Robson (born 27 April 1946, Bradford on Avon, United Kingdom) is a rock musician of English extraction who has achieved fame in Finland. He is known as a singer and a piano and organ player. He first came to Finland in 1967.

Robson had met some Finns in a London pub, and someone had given him their phone number. When Robson's band subsequently was on tour in Scandinavia, he found himself in Stockholm and got an idea to call the Finnish number. As a result of this, he found himself in Finland. At that time there was a demand for rock musicians in Finland who had English as their native language, especially for someone with experience from the music circles in London.
It is said that in London he had played with the Small Faces.

In Finland, Robson was quickly employed by a band named Mosaic, as their lead singer Kirill Babitzin had just gone solo under the name Kirka. Mosaic made a single, both songs on which were penned by Robson. Next Robson was asked to join Blues Section, to fill in for Jim Pembroke. With Blues Section Robson likewise made a single. During the summer of 1968 Robson played 50 gigs with Blues Section, and after the summer the band broke up and Robson returned to England.

Robson had thought he had gone home for good, but soon he was called back to Finland, to join a new group, the Tasavallan Presidentti. He played and sang lead vocals on their first two albums, but before the third one he was fired. This was unfortunate, as the band would now go on to play some high profile gigs in Robson's native England. However, he later got another chance, when the band was reformed in 1999 and made one more album, Six Complete, in 2006. The songs on this album were penned by Robson and Jukka Tolonen.

Robson has released five solo albums. He hopes to do at least one more, although in 2013 he was diagnosed with a cancer of the pharynx. After a number of operations, his voice is not what it used to be, but he sounds hopeful, saying that "it's somewhere between Joe Cocker and Louis Armstrong." Also his first two albums, Robson and Stay Awhile are about to be re-released by the Finnish record company Svart Records. The same company will also put out a collection of Robson's early singles, with a total of 14 songs.

Robson has two daughters, of which one, Jenny Robson, is also a singer.

Solo albums 
 Robson (1974)
 Stay Awhile (1976)}
 I Painted a Picture (1986)
 Sings Mick Hanian (1987)
 Back in Business (1998)

References

External links
 Frank Robson and Mosaic at YLE Elävä arkisto.

Finnish rock singers
Finnish rock musicians
Finnish keyboardists
1946 births
Living people